Souderton Area High School is a large public high school in the Montgomery County suburbs of Philadelphia located at 625 Lower Road in Souderton, Pennsylvania, United States, and serves residents in Souderton and Telford boroughs, and Franconia, Lower Salford and Upper Salford townships. It is the only high school in Souderton Area School District.

Extracurriculars
The district offers a variety of clubs, activities and sports. There are currently 75 different clubs students can join.

Notable alumni
1965: Donald Haldeman, 1976 Summer Olympics gold medalist in trapshooting
1975: Alex McArthur, film and television actor; appeared in Madonna's "Papa Don't Preach" video
1981: Jamie Moyer, pitcher for eight Major League Baseball teams from 1986-2012. 2008 World Series champion with the Philadelphia Phillies. Oldest MLB pitcher to win a game.
1982: Steven Grasse advertising distiller founder/owner of Gyro Worldwide and Art in the Age of Mechanical Reproduction
1984: Jon Wurster Drummer for Superchunk, The Mountain Goats, & Bob Mould and comedian with Scharpling and Wurster
1986: Rob Kampia, Marijuana activist
1988: Steven Stefanowicz Private military contractor at Abu Ghraib prison. Accused of ordering abusive interrogations some have labeled torture.
1989: Jared Hasselhoff, actor, moderator, radio host and Bloodhound Gang bass player
1997: Michael Joseph "Spanky G" Guthier. Former drummer for popular comedy rock group The Bloodhound Gang
2009: Jake Metz former Defensive End for the Buffalo Bills and former Arena Football League player for the Philadelphia Soul

References

External links
 Souderton Area High School
 Souderton Big Red Marching Band
 Souderton Forte Indoor Color Guard
 Souderton Mirage Drumline
 Souderton Jazz Band
 Souderton Academic Decathlon

Public high schools in Pennsylvania
Schools in Montgomery County, Pennsylvania
1931 establishments in Pennsylvania
Educational institutions established in 1931
School buildings completed in 2009